St. Mary's Chapel may refer to:

Ireland
St. Marys Chapel of Ease, Dublin

United Kingdom

England
St. Mary's Chapel, Jesmond, Newcastle upon Tyne
St Mary's Church, Hampstead, London
St Mary's Chapel, High Legh, Cheshire
Ss Mary & Everilda, Everingham, Yorkshire
Chantry Chapel of St Mary the Virgin, Wakefield, West Yorkshire

Northern Ireland
St. Marys Chapel, Maguiresbridge, County Fermanagh

Scotland
St Mary's Chapel, Crosskirk 12th-century
St Mary's Chapel, Rattray
St Mary's Chapel, Wyre, Orkney
Chapel of St. Mary and St. Nathalan, ruined chapel, Stonehaven

United States
St. Mary's Chapel (Adams County, Mississippi)
St. Mary's Chapel (Hillsborough, North Carolina)
St. Mary's Chapel (Raleigh, North Carolina)
St. Mary's Seminary Chapel, Baltimore, Maryland

See also
St. Mary's Church (disambiguation)
St. Mary's Cathedral (disambiguation)